Uncle Anesthesia is the fifth studio album by the American band Screaming Trees. It was released in 1991 via Epic Records. It includes three of the four tracks from the band's previous Epic release, Something About Today. 

"Bed of Roses" was released as a single and peaked at No. 23 on the Modern Rock charts. The band supported the album with a North American tour that included shows with Nirvana and Das Damen; Dan Peters played drums on much of the tour.

Production
Recorded at London Bridge Studio, Uncle Anesthesia was produced primarily by Terry Date and Soundgarden vocalist Chris Cornell. Unlike in the past, the band rehearsed for a couple of weeks before recording. The album took six and a half weeks to record.

Uncle Anesthesia was the last to feature drumming by original member Mark Pickerel, who left on amicable terms in 1991. He was replaced by Barrett Martin.

Critical reception

The Calgary Herald noted the "strong rockin' guitars with psychedelic undercurrents and the occasional pause for the pensive cause." The St. Petersburg Times wrote that "vocalist Mark Lanegan croons fairy tale lyrics that melt through a sonic wall of guitars and percussion." The Dayton Daily News concluded that "if Jim Morrison had joined a garage band instead of the jazz-trained Doors, it might have sounding something like Screaming Trees."

The Province opined that "Gary Lee Conner resurrects the guitar sound of Syd Barrett and takes the band toward Interstellar Overdrive." The Washington Post determined that "Gary Lee Conner can tear off a screeching lead or stomp a wah-wah pedal like any halfway-initiated Black Sabbath disciple, but he's not merely a piledriver; his atmospheric playing on tracks like 'Bed of Roses' give them unexpected delicacy." The San Diego Union-Tribune stated that "Lanegan's spooky, back-from-the-crypt vocals and Gary Lee Conner's luminous guitars give this album an otherworldly glow."

Track listing

Personnel
 Screaming Trees
 Mark Lanegan – vocals
 Gary Lee Conner – guitar, backing vocals
 Van Conner – bass, backing vocals
 Mark Pickerel – percussion, drums

 Additional musicians
 Chris Cornell – producer, recorder ("Lay Your Head Down"), backing Vocals ("Alice Said," "Uncle Anesthesia," "Before We Arise")
 Terry Date – backing vocals, producer, engineer
 Scott Miller – backing vocals
 Terry Pickerel – percussion
 Jeff McGraph – trumpet

 Additional personnel
 David Coleman – art direction
 Karen Mason – photography
 Mark Ryden – artwork
 Screaming Trees – producer

Charts
Singles - Billboard (North America)

References

Screaming Trees albums
1991 albums
Epic Records albums
Albums produced by Chris Cornell
Albums produced by Terry Date
Albums with cover art by Mark Ryden